Ye Shi (1150–1223), courtesy name Zhengze (正则), pseudonym Mr. Shuixin (水心先生), was a Chinese neo-Confucian of the Song dynasty.

A native of Wenzhou, Zhejiang, he was the most famous figure of the Yongjia School, a neo-Confucianism School composed mostly of philosophers from Wenzhou Prefecture in Zhejiang province.  In contrast to other scholars in the same period like Zhu Xi and Lu Jiuyuan, he stressed practical learning and applying Confucian doctrine to real world problems. This school had important influence on  later thinkers from Zhejiang province, including Wang Shouren and Huang Zongxi, who were the most important philosophers in the Ming and Qing periods.

References

Song dynasty philosophers
12th-century Chinese philosophers
13th-century Chinese philosophers
1150 births
1223 deaths
Chinese Confucianists
Writers from Wenzhou
Philosophers from Zhejiang
Song dynasty politicians from Zhejiang
Politicians from Wenzhou
Song dynasty essayists